Wake is a 2004 weathering steel sculpture by Richard Serra, installed at Olympic Sculpture Park in Seattle, Washington. Arts Observer called the installation "a must-see", offering "incredibly diverse perspectives from various angles and vantage points". It was the first piece installed in the park, in July 2006.

See also

 2004 in art

References

External links
 

2004 sculptures
2006 establishments in Washington (state)
Olympic Sculpture Park
Outdoor sculptures in Seattle
Steel sculptures in Washington (state)
Weathering steel